Sonnet 134 is one of 154 sonnets written by the English poet and playwright William Shakespeare.  In it, the speaker confronts the Dark Lady after learning that she has seduced the Fair Youth.

Synopsis

In the first quatrain, the speaker confesses that both he and the friend are at the mistress's mercy; in the second one, he surmises that the attachment will hold, due to the friend's naivete and the mistress's greed.

The remainder of the poem construes the mistress as an unethical moneylender: metaphorically, she lent her beauty to the speaker and then collected the friend as interest.

Structure 
Sonnet 134 is an English or Shakespearean sonnet. The English sonnet has three quatrains, followed by a final rhyming couplet. It follows the typical rhyme scheme of the form ABAB CDCD EFEF GG and is composed in iambic pentameter, a type of poetic metre based on five pairs of metrically weak/strong syllabic positions. The 1st line exemplifies a regular iambic pentameter:

 ×   /  ×  /    ×  /       ×   / ×    / 
So, now I have confess'd that he is thine (134.1)
/ = ictus, a metrically strong syllabic position. × = nonictus.

Line 8 begins with a common metrical variation, the initial reversal:

/  ×    ×   /     ×   /  ×   /    ×    / 
Under that bond that him as fast doth bind. (134.8)

A potential initial reversal occurs in line 4. Line 13 contains both an initial reversal and a potential mid-line reversal.

In line 7 the meter demands the two-syllable Elizabethan pronunciation of "surety".

Notes

References

British poems
Sonnets by William Shakespeare